QSN may refer to:

 QSN, the IATA code for San Nicolás de Bari Airport, Mayabeque Province, Cuba
 QSN, the telegraph code for Queshan railway station, Zhumadian, Henan, China